Microsoft Pinyin IME is the pinyin input method implementation developed by Microsoft and Harbin Institute of Technology. It is bundled with Microsoft Windows and Chinese editions of Microsoft Office. Various versions can be downloaded from Microsoft's website with some restrictions.

History

Since Windows 95 OSR2, Simplified Chinese edition of Windows automatically installed the bundled Microsoft Pinyin IME. Windows 98 came with version 1.5. The Version 2.0 was released with Microsoft Office 2000 and bundled with Windows 2000.

Windows XP and Microsoft Office XP came with Microsoft Pinyin IME 3.0. 

Microsoft Pinyin IME 2003 was released with Office 2003. Microsoft Pinyin IME 2003 is later included in Windows Vista. Microsoft Pinyin IME (Ver: 10.1.7600.0) is included in Windows 7.

Microsoft Office Pinyin IME 2007 was released with Microsoft Office 2007. In 2008, Microsoft released a word list update for this version.

Later versions of the IME came in number of different editions. Usually the Express/Select editions are smaller but feature only common functionalities and the standard word list. 

Microsoft Office Pinyin IME 2007 is not supported by 64-bit versions of Windows. The most recent version available for use on 64-bit systems is Microsoft Pinyin IME 4.0, however the final version of Microsoft Office Pinyin IME 2010 does feature full 64-bit support.

See also
 Google Pinyin
 Sogou Pinyin

References

External links
 
 

Han character input
Pinyin IME
Han pinyin input